Santiago Pedro Darraidou (born November 24, 1980 in Buenos Aires) is an Argentine volleyball player. Darraidou is 194 cm and weighs 96 kg. He speaks Spanish, English and Italian.

Clubs

International Caps

Titles and awards
2005 - Best blocker FIVB America's Cup

References
sports-reference

1980 births
Living people
Argentine men's volleyball players
Fenerbahçe volleyballers
A.C. Orestias players
Volleyball players at the 2004 Summer Olympics
Olympic volleyball players of Argentina
Volleyball players from Buenos Aires